Proteinania was a genus of moths of the family Noctuidae, it is now considered to be a synonym of Hypotrix.

References
Natural History Museum Lepidoptera genus database

Hadeninae